La mañana de Chilevisión (English: The Morning of Chilevision) is a Chilean morning show that has aired on Chilevisión since February 29, 2012.

Hosts 
 Current hosts
 Ignacio Gutierrez (since 2013)
 Carolina de Moras (since 2015)

 Past hosts
 Eva Gómez (2012-2013)
 Cristián Sánchez (2012-2013)
 Carmen Gloria Arroyo (2013-2015)

External links 
  

2012 Chilean television series debuts
Chilevisión original programming
Breakfast television